John Fowell may refer to 

Sir John Fowell, 2nd Baronet, English politician
Sir John Fowell, 3rd Baronet, English politician

See also
Fowell (surname)